Saint-Sauveur-de-Peyre is a former commune in the Lozère department in southern France. On 1 January 2017, it was merged into the new commune Peyre-en-Aubrac. Its population was 243 in 2019.

See also
Communes of the Lozère department

References

Saintsauveurdepeyre